The City of York is a unitary authority of the United Kingdom. There are many distinct localities, suburbs and villages within the administrative area of the City. All areas in the City are in the YO postcode area, also known as the York postcode area.

Local government
York is an ancient English borough, and was one of the boroughs reformed by the Municipal Corporations Act 1835 to form a municipal borough. It gained the status of a county borough in 1889, under the Local Government Act 1888, and existed so until 1974, when, under the Local Government Act 1972, it became a non-metropolitan district in the county of North Yorkshire.

As a result of 1990s UK local government reform, York gained unitary status and saw a substantial alteration in its borders, taking in parts of Selby and Harrogate districts, and about half the population of the Ryedale district. The new boundary was imposed after central Government had rejected the former city council's own proposal.

The City of York Council has 47 councillors serving 22 wards.

Parliamentary constituencies
Until the 2010 United Kingdom general election, most of York was covered by the City of York constituency of the Parliament of the United Kingdom, but the outer parts of the city and local council area fell within the Selby, Vale of York and Ryedale constituencies. For 2010, two new constituencies (York Central and York Outer) were created.

The whole of the city and local council area lay within the Yorkshire and the Humber constituency of the European Parliament.

List of places in York

The individual areas of the City of York are all within the Unitary Authority area as defined by the Fifth Periodical Report, Volume 4, "Mapping for the Non-Metropolitan Counties and the Unitary Authorities as published by the Boundary Commission For England", specifically on pages 106–109. Population details are taken from the UK Census of 2001 and 2011. Some areas that have a population for 2001 are taken from local ecclesiastical parish information and has not been updated for 2011. Other areas without any population information is due to a lack of ecclesiastical parish information, mostly because the area has never been one and is included only due to it being an identifiable and distinct area according to Ordnance Survey maps.

Places in the York Built-up area 
The York Built-up area is defined by the Office for National Statistics for census purposes.

Villages outside the York Built-up area

References 

York-related lists